Richard Howard (born 8 March 1944, Hitchin, Hertfordshire) is a British actor.

His father was a civil servant and he attended a preparatory school and Haberdashers' Aske's School. He then trained as an actor at the Bristol Old Vic Theatre School before appearing on stage in repertory theatre, at the Oxford Playhouse and the Royal Court Theatre.

Select filmography
Oh! What a Lovely War (1969)
Agatha Christie's Poirot episodes - Four and Twenty Blackbirds (1989)
The People’s Princess (2008)

External links

Living people
English male stage actors
People from Hitchin
1944 births
English male film actors
Male actors from Hertfordshire